The women's 4 × 400 metres relay event at the 2003 Summer Universiade was held in Daegu, South Korea on 30 August.

Results

References
Results

Athletics at the 2003 Summer Universiade
2003